Union Church of Port Royal, also known as Port Royal White Union Church, 11th Street Tabernacle, and Free Church of Port Royal, is a historic church located at Port Royal, Beaufort County, South Carolina.  It was completed in 1878, and consists of a one-story, wood frame, brick-piered building with a central entry and portico.  It has a cupola containing the church's belfry.  It was built with donated lumber by local citizens in 1877–1878 to provide the Port Royal community its only white house of worship at that time.

It was listed in the National Register of Historic Places in 2010.

References

Churches on the National Register of Historic Places in South Carolina
Churches completed in 1878
Churches in Beaufort County, South Carolina
National Register of Historic Places in Beaufort County, South Carolina